Than Shwe (born 2 February 1933) is a Burmese strongman politician who was the head of state of Myanmar from 1992 to 2011 as Chairman of the State Peace and Development Council (SPDC).

During this period, he held key positions of power including Prime Minister of Myanmar, Commander-in-chief of Myanmar Defense Services and head of the Union Solidarity and Development Association. In March 2011 he officially stepped down as head of state in favour of his hand-picked successor, Thein Sein, and as head of the Armed Forces, being replaced by general Min Aung Hlaing. He continues to retain great power in the military.

Early life
Than Shwe was born in Minzu village, near Kyaukse, British Burma in 1933 or 1935. In 1949, Than Shwe attended and finished in Government High School in Kyaukse. He took up employment at the Meikhtila Post Office as a postal clerk. Later he enlisted in the Burmese Army and was in the ninth intake of the Officers Training School, Bahtoo.

Military career and rise to power
After graduating from the Officer Training School, Second Lieutenant Than Shwe was posted to No. 1 Infantry Battalion as a squad leader on 11 July 1953. He was promoted to platoon commander with the rank of lieutenant on 11 July 1955 and to company commander with the rank of captain on 21 February 1957 in the same battalion. He was involved in military operations carried out by No. 1 Infantry Battalion in Karen State, Southern Shan State and Eastern Thanlwin area.

On 26 February 1958, Than Shwe was transferred to the newly established Directorate of Education and Psychological warfare within the War Office. Between April 1958 and November 1958, Shwe attended a special course for army officers in the Soviet Union run by the KGB. He was posted as a Company Commander to No. 1 Psychological Warfare Battalion under Northern Regional Military Command on 9 December 1961. He became Psychological Warfare Officer of 3rd Infantry Brigade on 4 December 1961. On 18 December 1963, he was transferred to Central Political College as an instructor. He was posted to 101 Light Infantry Battalion as a temporary company commander for battalion headquarter unit.

Than Shwe was promoted to the rank of major and posted to the 77th (LID) Light Infantry Division on 27 January 1969. Between 1969 and 1971, Than Shwe attended and graduated from the Higher Command and Staff Course from the Frunze Military Academy in the Soviet Union. He was involved in various military operations carried out by the 77th LID in Karen State, Irrawaddy Delta region and Bago Hills. He was transferred to Operations Planning Department within the Office of Chief of Staff (ARMY) as a General Staff Officer (G2) on 16 December 1969.

He became a temporary commander of No. 1 Infantry Battalion on 23 August 1971 and was promoted to the rank of lieutenant colonel on 7 September 1972. As the commanding officer of No. 1 Infantry Battalion, he was involved in offensive operations against various insurgents carried out by the 88th (LID) Light Infantry Division in Bhamo region, northern Shan State, southern Shan State, and eastern Shan State. He was transferred back to Operations Planning Department within the Office of Chief of Staff (ARMY) as a General Staff Officer (G1) on 4 August 1975. On 26 March 1977, Than Shwe became a colonel. He then became a deputy commander of the 88th LID Light Infantry Division on 2 May 1978.

Than Shwe became commanding officer of the 88th LID on 29 March 1980. He oversaw the various operation such as Operation Ye Naing Aung, Operation Nay Min Yang and Operation Min Yan Aung carried out by the 88th LID. In 1981, Than Shwe was elected as a member of the ruling Burma Socialist Programme Party's Central Executive Committee during the fourth session of Party's conference.

He was posted to the South Western Regional Military Command as the commanding officer on 22 July 1983 and subsequently became chairman of Irrawaddy Division Party Committee on 5 August 1983. He became a brigadier general on 16 August 1984. Than Shwe became vice chief of staff (Army) on 4 November 1985.

Than Shwe was promoted to the rank of major general on 4 November 1986 and to the rank of lieutenant general on 4 November 1987. He became Deputy Minister of Defence on 27 July 1988.

After the military coup on 18 September 1988 after the democracy uprising of 1988, Than Shwe became vice-chairman of State Law and Order Restoration Council (SLORC), a 21-member military cabinet headed by General Saw Maung. He was promoted to the rank of full general and became vice-commander in chief of Myanmar Armed Forces and commander in chief of Myanmar Army on 18 March 1990.

On 23 April 1992, Senior General Saw Maung unexpectedly resigned, citing health reasons. Than Shwe elevated himself to the rank of senior general and replaced Saw Maung as head of the State Law and Order Restoration Council (SLORC) and commander in chief of the Myanmar Armed Forces.

Style of leadership

Than Shwe relaxed some state control over the economy, and was a supporter of Burma's participation in the Association of South East Asian Nations (ASEAN). He also oversaw a large crackdown on corruption, which saw the sackings of a number of cabinet ministers and regional commanders in 1997.

The convention for the "Discipline Democracy New Constitution" was convened from 9 January 1993 to 3 September 2007, a period of more than 14 years and 8 months. Although the main opposition party, National League for Democracy (NLD) led by Aung San Suu Kyi, which won the multi-party democracy general election in 1990, did not participate, the chairman of National Convention Lieutenant General Thein Sein announced that the creation of the "Constitution" had been accomplished.

Than Shwe has continued the suppression of the free press in Burma, and has overseen the detention of journalists who oppose his regime. While he oversaw the release of Aung San Suu Kyi during the late 1990s, he also oversaw her return to detention in 2003. Despite his relaxation of some restrictions on Burma's economy, his economic policies have been often criticized as ill-planned.

He maintains a low profile. He tends to be seen as being sullen, humorless, and rather withdrawn, a hardliner, skilled manipulator, and an opponent of the democratization of Burma. He marks national holidays and ceremonies with messages in the state-run newspapers, but rarely talks to the press. The lavish wedding of his daughter, involving diamonds and champagne, was particularly controversial in a country whose people continue to suffer enormous poverty and enforced austerity.

Power struggles have plagued Burma's military leadership. Than Shwe has been linked to the toppling and arrest of Prime Minister Khin Nyunt in 2004, which has significantly increased his own power. The former premier, who said he supported Aung San Suu Kyi's involvement in the National Convention, was seen as a moderate at odds with the junta's hardliners.

Than Shwe is said to rely heavily on advice from his soothsayers, a style of ruling dating back to Ne Win, a leader who once shot his mirror to avoid bad luck.

In May and November 2006 he met with the United Nations special envoy Ibrahim Gambari in the newly built capital of Naypyidaw, which had replaced Yangon in the previous year, and permitted Gambari to meet with Aung San Suu Kyi. However, Than Shwe refused to meet Gambari when he visited Burma in November 2007 and again on 10 March 2008.

In early May 2008, Than Shwe refused many foreign aid workers from entering the country in the aftermath of Cyclone Nargis (May 2, 2008). This led to many criticisms from the UN as well as the international community.

In early July 2009, the UN Secretary-General Ban Ki-Moon visited Burma and held talks with General Than Shwe. The military junta rejected UN Secretary General's request to meet with Aung San Suu Kyi. Than Shwe also commented on the upcoming 2010 Burmese election, saying that by the time the UN chief next visits Burma, "I will be an ordinary citizen, a lay person, and my colleagues will too because it will be a civilian government."

On 27 August 2010, rumours surfaced that Than Shwe and his deputy, Vice Senior General Maung Aye, along with six other top military officers, had resigned their military posts, and that he was expected to remain head of state until at least the end of the 2011 fiscal year, when he would transfer his position to the elected president. The rumor was proven false as the Burmese state media referred to him as Senior General three days later.

Human rights controversies
Than Shwe's leadership has been criticized for violence and human rights abuses. Amnesty International described human rights violations in Myanmar as "widespread and systematic." As many as a million Burmese allegedly were shipped off to "jungle gulags" and forced to perform manual labor. There was no free speech, and dissent was not tolerated by the government. In 2007, mass demonstrations were led by crowds of Buddhist monks, but they were put down by security forces who killed, beat and detained hundreds. There were persistent rumors that thousands of monks and others were rounded up and summarily executed and their bodies dumped in the jungle.

In 1998 Than Shwe ordered the execution of 59 civilians living on Christie Island. When the local commander on Christie Island initially hesitated to kill the civilians, fearing the commander who had given the order was drunk, he was told the instruction came from "Aba Gyi" or "Great Father"—the term used to refer to General Than Shwe.

Health and family
Than Shwe's wife, Kyaing Kyaing, is of Chinese and Pa'O descent. They have five daughters, Aye Aye Thit Shwe, Dewa Shwe, Khin Pyone Shwe, Kyi Kyi Shwe, and Thandar Shwe, and three sons, Kyaing San Shwe, Thant Zaw Shwe and Htun Naing Shwe.
Than Shwe is known to be a diabetic, and he is rumored to have intestinal cancer. Little else is known about his private life as he rarely makes public appearances or discloses personal information.

Than Shwe flew to Singapore on 31 December 2006. Concerns about Than's health intensified after he failed to appear at an official Independence Day dinner for military leaders, officials, and diplomats on 4 January 2007. It was the first time since he took power in 1992 that Than did not host the annual dinner. Than Shwe had checked out of the Singapore General Hospital, where he had been receiving treatment, and returned to Burma two weeks later.

In 2006, a home video footage of the wedding of Than Shwe's daughter, Thandar Shwe, was leaked on the Internet, which sparked controversy and criticism from Burmese and foreign media for the lavish and seemingly ostentatious reception. After days of Saffron Revolution, there were unconfirmed reports that Than Shwe's wife and pets fled the country on 27 September 2007, possibly to Laos.

In January 2009, Than Shwe was talked into buying one of the world's most popular football clubs, Manchester United, for $1 billion by his favourite grandson Nay Shwe Thway Aung. However, he reportedly abandoned the plan, because such an investment only months after nearly 150,000 people were killed by Cyclone Nargis was deemed inappropriate.

On In August 2021, Than Swe and his wife tested positive for COVID-19. They have been warded at the 1,000-bed military-owned hospital in Thaik Chaung.

Yadaya rituals

Than Shwe often performed superstitious yadaya rituals to maintain his power and followed the advice of astrologers and shamans. A seated jade Buddha statue that Than Shwe had carved in his image was erected in 1999 at the southern entrance of Shwedagon pagoda. It is on a list of unorthodox statues drawn up by the religious affairs ministry. Former UN secretary-general Ban Ki-moon and Chinese President Xi Jinping are among those who have paid respects at the statue during visits to Yangon.

As a notoriously superstitious, the unusual clothing choices, namely the wearing of traditional female acheik-patterned longyi (sarongs) by Than Shwe and other military generals at public appearances, including Union Day celebrations in February 2011 and at the reception of the Lao Prime Minister Bouasone Bouphavanh in June 2011 have also been attributed to yadaya, as a way to divert power to neutralize Aung San Suu Kyi's power.

References

Bibliography
Johnson, Robert (2005). A region in turmoil: South Asian conflicts since 1947. Reaktion Books. .

External links
 
 
 Than Shwe Watch at the Irrawaddy
 

|-

1933 births
Age controversies
Burma Socialist Programme Party politicians
Deputy Prime Ministers of Myanmar
Burmese generals
Living people
People from Mandalay Region
Frunze Military Academy alumni
Family of Than Shwe
Militarism
Officers Training School, Bahtoo alumni